Entrance Shoal is a small shoal, with a least depth of , just west of Entrance Island at the northwest entrance to Horseshoe Harbour in Holme Bay, Mac. Robertson Land. It was charted in February 1961 by d'A.T. Gale, hydrographic surveyor with the Australian National Antarctic Research Expeditions (Thala Dan), and so named because of its location.

References 

Barrier islands of Antarctica
Islands of Mac. Robertson Land